Gozd–Reka is a dispersed settlement in the hills southwest of Šmartno pri Litiji in central Slovenia. It belongs to the Municipality of Šmartno pri Litiji, which is included in the Central Slovenia Statistical Region. The area is part of the traditional region of Lower Carniola.

References

External links
Gozd–Reka at Geopedia

Populated places in the Municipality of Šmartno pri Litiji